The Essential *NSYNC is the fourth compilation album by American boy band NSYNC. It was released on July 29, 2014, four years after their second compilation The Collection (2010). It is also the second overall album under RCA Records following their self-titled album in 1998. The album contains a total of thirty-four tracks, including hit singles, album tracks, B-sides, rare recordings and soundtrack features. Despite only being a compilation release, the album received wide press coverage as it was revealed none of the band members were told about its release.

The album sold out on Amazon on the day of release, and quickly vaulted into the top ten albums on the iTunes Store.

Band member Lance Bass said of the album on his radio show, Dirty Pop: "There's a lot of these songs I don't think I've ever heard, I remember recording them but I've never heard them before, so I'm interested in just hearing them." JC Chasez tweeted about the album's release, stating: "I had the strangest dream last night that some old friends and I had a top 10 record on iTunes. Crazy right..." Chris Kirkpatrick said of the album; "It's great to release some of the songs that had never made a record before! I'm glad our long time fans get some new music!" Joey Fatone also said; "Pretty interesting this album comes out, which I really had no idea, and it's in the top of Amazon and iTunes... we owe it to our fans. Thank you."

The album has sold 34,000 copies in the US according to Nielsen SoundScan as of February 2018.

Track listing

Charts

Certifications

References

2014 greatest hits albums
NSYNC albums
RCA Records compilation albums